Newport Music Hall is a music venue located in the University District of Columbus, Ohio, across the street from the Ohio Union of the Ohio State University. It is "America's Longest Continually Running Rock Club".

History

Newport Music Hall opened in 1921; it was then known as the State Theater. In the 1970s, it became known as the Agora Ballroom. The hall seats 2,000 and most of the original decor is intact. It is one of the many music venues on High Street in Columbus, and the oldest continually running venue. In the past, they have had indoor and outdoor events. Tickets are sold at the Newport box office (open at noon on show days).

Newport was the last American venue at which John Lee Hooker performed before his death in 2001.

The Newport was purchased by PromoWest in 1984, reopening as the Newport Music Hall. Located next to the campus of the Ohio State University, Newport Music Hall maintains the preservation of its historical ballroom architecture and the legacy of its past and present performers. With a 2,000 person capacity and hosting over 150,000 guests a year, the Newport Music Hall has become one of the most famous rock clubs in the country.

In 2020, the building that houses Newport was put up for sale by its owners, but this will not directly affect the venue.

References

External links

 
 

Music venues in Columbus, Ohio
University District (Columbus, Ohio)
Concert halls in Ohio
Movie palaces
Theatres in Columbus, Ohio
Theatres completed in 1921
1921 establishments in Ohio
Music venues in Ohio
High Street (Columbus, Ohio)